William Don Williams (December 3, 1927 – December 4, 2013) was an American football and track and field coach. He served as the head football coach at Concord University in Athens, West Virginia from 1959 to 1969, compiling a record of 42–55–4. Williams was also the head track coach at Marshall University in Huntington, West Virginia from 1972 to 1974.

References

External links
 

1927 births
2013 deaths
Concord Mountain Lions football coaches
Marshall Thundering Herd track and field coaches
High school football coaches in Virginia
High school football coaches in West Virginia
Sportspeople from Akron, Ohio